Shubert is a village in Richardson County, Nebraska, United States. The population was 163 at the 2020 census.

History
Shubert was platted in 1883. The village was named for Henry W. Shubert, a pioneer settler.

Geography
Shubert is located at  (40.236860, -95.683546).

Demographics

2010 census
As of the census of 2010, there were 150 people, 73 households, and 48 families residing in the village. The racial makeup of the village was 96.7% White, 0.7% from other races, and 2.7% from two or more races. Hispanic or Latino of any race were 2.7% of the population.

There were 73 households, of which 19.2% had children under the age of 18 living with them, 52.1% were married couples living together, 9.6% had a female householder with no husband present, 4.1% had a male householder with no wife present, and 34.2% were non-families. 30.1% of all households were made up of individuals, and 15.1% had someone living alone who was 65 years of age or older. The average household size was 2.05 and the average family size was 2.52.

The median age in the village was 48.3 years. 18% of residents were under the age of 18; 7.3% were between the ages of 18 and 24; 19.4% were from 25 to 44; 36% were from 45 to 64; and 19.3% were 65 years of age or older. The gender makeup of the village was 50.7% male and 49.3% female.

2000 census
As of the census of 2000, there were 252 people, 100 households, and 64 families residing in the village. The population density was 1,204.9 people per square mile (463.3/km). There were 110 housing units at an average density of 525.9 per square mile (202.2/km). The racial makeup of the village was 97.22% White, 1.19% Native American, 0.79% from other races, and 0.79% from two or more races. Hispanic or Latino of any race were 2.78% of the population.

There were 100 households, out of which 37.0% had children under the age of 18 living with them, 49.0% were married couples living together, 9.0% had a female householder with no husband present, and 36.0% were non-families. 31.0% of all households were made up of individuals, and 13.0% had someone living alone who was 65 years of age or older. The average household size was 2.52 and the average family size was 3.20.

In the village, the population was spread out, with 31.7% under the age of 18, 7.5% from 18 to 24, 29.4% from 25 to 44, 18.7% from 45 to 64, and 12.7% who were 65 years of age or older. The median age was 36 years. For every 100 females, there were 93.8 males. For every 100 females age 18 and over, there were 95.5 males.

As of 2000 the median income for a household in the village was $25,417, and the median income for a family was $35,625. Males had a median income of $25,455 versus $20,625 for females. The per capita income for the village was $11,505. About 7.2% of families and 14.9% of the population were below the poverty line, including 17.5% of those under the age of eighteen and 10.8% of those 65 or over.

Education
Its school district is Humboldt Table Rock Steinauer Public Schools.

Shubert was previously in Southeast Nebraska Consolidated Schools. On January 1, 2009, it merged into the Humboldt Table Rock Steinauer School District.

References

Villages in Richardson County, Nebraska
Villages in Nebraska